The Impostor is a 1926 American silent crime film directed by Chester Withey and starring Evelyn Brent, Carroll Nye and James Morrison.

Synopsis
A financially struggling young man uses a family jewel as security on a loan, only for the jewel to then be stolen by a notorious gambler. His sister Judith takes it upon herself to recover the missing jewel and goes undercover to achieve this.

Cast
 Evelyn Brent as Judith Gilbert
 Carroll Nye as Dick Gilbert
 James Morrison as Gordon
 Frank Leigh as De Mornoff
 James Quinn as Lefty 
 Carlton Griffin as 	Morris
 Edna Griffin as Ann Penn

References

Bibliography
 Connelly, Robert B. The Silents: Silent Feature Films, 1910-36, Volume 40, Issue 2. December Press, 1998.
 Munden, Kenneth White. The American Film Institute Catalog of Motion Pictures Produced in the United States, Part 1. University of California Press, 1997.

External links
 

1926 films
1926 crime films
American silent feature films
American crime films
American black-and-white films
Films directed by Chester Withey
Film Booking Offices of America films
1920s English-language films
1920s American films